Cipotânea is a Brazilian municipality located in the state of Minas Gerais. The city belongs to the mesoregion of Zona da Mata and to the microregion of Viçosa. Its area is 153.435 km².  As of 2020, the estimated population was 6,799.

See also
 List of municipalities in Minas Gerais

References

https://web.archive.org/web/20081207153219/http://pt.netlog.com/cipotanea

Municipalities in Minas Gerais